John George Phillimore (1808–1865) was an English barrister, known as a jurist and Liberal Party politician.

Life
The eldest son of Joseph Phillimore, he was born on 5 January 1808, and was educated at Westminster School. On 28 May 1824 he matriculated at Christ Church, Oxford, of which he was faculty student, and graduated B.A. in 1828, having taken a second class in the classical schools; he proceeded M.A. in 1831.

From 1827 to 1832 Phillimore held a clerkship in the Board of Control for India, and on 23 November 1832 was called to the bar at Lincoln's Inn, where he was elected a bencher in 1851. In 1850 Phillimore was appointed reader in civil law and jurisprudence at the Middle Temple. In 1851 he took silk, and in the following year he was appointed reader in constitutional law and legal history to the Inns of Court.

Phillimore represented Leominster as a Liberal in the Parliament of 1852–1857. He spoke on free trade, legal reform, and the secret ballot. He died on 27 April 1865 at his residence, Shiplake House, Oxfordshire.

Works
His writings, all published at London, were:

 Letter to the Lord Chancellor on the Reform of the Law, 1846. 
 Thoughts on Law Reform, 1847. 
 Introduction to the Study and History of the Roman Law, 1848. 
 An Inaugural Lecture on Jurisprudence, and a Lecture on Canon Law, 1851. 
 Principles and Maxims of Jurisprudence, 1856. 
 Influence of the Canon Law (in Oxford Essays), 1858. 
 Private Law among the Romans, 1863.
 History of England during the Reign of George the Third (one volume only), 1863.

Family
By his wife Rosalind Margaret, younger daughter of Sir James Lewis Knight-Bruce, he had issue an only son Egerton Grenville Bagot Phillimore, known as an antiquarian of Welsh language and history.

References

Notes

Attribution

External links 
 

1808 births
1865 deaths
English barristers
Liberal Party (UK) MPs for English constituencies
UK MPs 1852–1857
People educated at Westminster School, London
Alumni of Christ Church, Oxford
Members of Lincoln's Inn
19th-century King's Counsel